At Montreux Jazz Festival is a 1998 album by Israeli singer Ofra Haza.  The recording which captures Haza and a five-piece band live at the Montreux Jazz Festival in July 1990 comprises material from her international studio albums Shaday, Yemenite Songs and Desert Wind, including hit singles like "Im Nin' Alu", "Galbi", "Shaday", "Ya Ba Ye", as well as Yemeni Jewish traditionals and the a cappella performance of "Love Song" with lyrics from The Song of Songs. 

The album was first issued in 1998 and re-released internationally on the Locust Music label in 2005.
The live concert film released in 2007.

Track listing
"Im Nin' Alu" (Shabazi) - 4:00  
"Hilwi" (Traditional) - 3:55  
"Eshal" (Aloni, Haza) - 4:31  
"Asalk" (Amram, Shabazi) - 5:13  
"Taw Shi" (Aloni, Dolby, Haza) - 4:07  
"Fatamorgana (Mirage)"  (Aloni, Haza) - 4:48  
Medley: "Galbi"/"Wen Esalam"/"Ayooma"  (Aloni, Amram, Haza, Traditional) - 16:03  
"Rassa" (Aloni, Haza) - 3:03  
"Shaday" (Aloni, Haza) - 6:21  
"La Fa La" (Shabazi) - 8:29  
"Love Song" (Aloni, Traditional) - 2:57  
"Ya Ba Ye" (Aloni, Haza) - 4:49  
"Kaddish" (Aloni, Haza) - 5:37

Personnel
 Ofra Haza - lead vocals
 Eric Person - flute, saxophone
 Haim Cotton - keyboards
 Tzour Ben Zeev - electric bass
 Jim Mussen - drums
 Daniel Sadownick - congas, bongos, timbales, percussion

Ofra Haza albums
1998 live albums
albums recorded at the Montreux Jazz Festival